Knights of the Desert (Italian:I cavalieri del deserto) is a 1942 Italian adventure film directed by Gino Talamo and Osvaldo Valenti. It starred Valenti, Luisa Ferida and Luigi Pavese. The film was based on a novel by Emilio Salgari with a screenplay by Federico Fellini and Vittorio Mussolini, the son of Italy's dictator Benito Mussolini. It was produced by the Rome-based ACI which was run by Vittorio Mussolini. Valenti and Ferida were romantically linked, and co-starred in several films together.

The film was shot on location in Libya, before the North African Campaign turned decisively against Italy and its Allies. Fellini may have directed some of the Libyan scenes after Gino Talamo was injured in a car accident. The film was ultimately never released due to the defeats suffered in Libya, which meant its plot was now a potential embarrassment to the regime.

Cast
 Osvaldo Valenti as Il capitano Serra  
 Luisa Ferida as Ara 
 Luigi Pavese as El-Burnì  
 Guido Celano 
 Piero Lulli 
 Erminio Spalla 
 Primo Carnera

References

External links 

1942 films
Italian adventure films
1942 adventure films
1940s Italian-language films
Films based on works by Emilio Salgari
Films directed by Gino Talamo
Films shot in Libya
Films based on Italian novels
1940s unfinished films
Italian black-and-white films
Films with screenplays by Federico Fellini
Films scored by Renzo Rossellini
1940s Italian films